Mark Twain is a neighborhood of St. Louis, Missouri named after author and Missouri native Mark Twain. It is located between Interstate 70 and Bellefontaine Cemetery.

Demographics

In 2020 Mark Twain's racial makeup was 95.1% Black, 2.4% White, 0.2% Native American, 0.3% Asian, 1.4% Two or More Races, and 0.6% Some Other Race. 1.0% of the population was of Hispanic or Latino origin.

References

Neighborhoods in St. Louis